The 2013 ESF Women's Championship was an international European softball competition that was held in Prague, Czech Republic from July 7 to July 13, 2013. Prague hosted Championships for the 4th time.

Results

Group A

Group B

Group C

Group D

Medal Round

Final standings

References

Women's Softball European Championship
Womens Softball European Championship
International sports competitions hosted by the Czech Republic
Sports competitions in Prague
Softball competitions in the Czech Republic
July 2013 sports events in Europe
ESF Women's Championship
Euro